In Arthurian legend, Gorlois of Tintagel, Duke of Cornwall, is the first husband of Igraine, whose second husband is Uther Pendragon. Gorlois's name first appears in Geoffrey of Monmouth's Historia Regum Britanniae. A vassal of Ambrosius Aurelianus, his arrival at the Battle of Kaerconan ensures the defeat of Hengist. In Wace's Roman de Brut, when Hengist's son Octa and his cousin Ossa rebel, Gorlois helps Uther defeat them at York.

Narrative
After he succeeds his brother, Ambrosius, Uther holds a feast for his nobles, and seeing Igraine, falls in love with her. Sensing Uther's interest, Igraine asks her husband to take her back home to Cornwall. He placed her at the more defensible Tintagel Castle, while he prepared to defend his territory from Dimilioc. Incensed at their departing without leave, Uther lays siege to Gorlois' castles to little effect. He consults his friend Ulfin who tells him that the lady can hardly look favorably on someone who makes war on her husband, and suggests the king seek advice from Merlin in gaining access to Tintagel. Merlin devises an enchantment that disguises Uther in the form of Gorlois. In this form he approaches his love and they sleep together, conceiving Arthur. Unbeknownst to either of them, the real Gorlois has been killed that very night in battle against Uther's troops. Eventually Igraine is persuaded to marry Uther.

Gorlois is the father of Morgan le Fay, Morgause, and Elaine of Garlot. Later treatments, such as the Vulgate Cycle and Thomas Malory's Le Morte d'Arthur expand on this outline by having Gorlois's daughters married off to vassals of Uther: Elaine to King Nentres of Garlot, Morgause to King Lot of Orkney, and (after she has received an education in a convent) Morgan to King Urien. Arthur is spared any knowledge of his half-sisters after he is whisked away by Merlin to be raised by Sir Ector.

Other mentions
The 11th/12th century Welsh text Culhwch and Olwen lists "Gormant son of Rica (Arthur's brother on his mother's side, his father the chief elder of Cornwall)". The text can be read with either Gormant or Ricca being Arthur's half-brother, and is a parallel to later stories of Gorlois and Igraine. Scholars Rachel Bromwich and D. Simon Evans note the similarity between the Gor- element in Gormant and Gorlois' names, which may equate them, or could reflect a known practice in some late antiquity and early medieval European dynasties to share a name prefix. Ricca could be an earlier name given to the husband of Igraine, or could be equated with Ricatus, a possible later king of Cornwall. The Peniarth triads give the same title—Arthur's chief elder at Celliwig, Cornwall—to Caradoc, which could also equate him with either Ricca, or his father.

In the Brut Tysilio, a Welsh version of Geoffrey's work, Gorlois is the father of Cador, Duke of Cornwall, presumably by Igraine. In Thomas Hughes' 1587 play The Misfortunes of Arthur, Gorlois' ghost condemns Arthur for his father's treachery. Richard Carew's Survey of Cornwall (1602) places Gorlois as husband of Igerna and duke of Cornwall in 500 AD, who is succeeded by Earl Cador by 526 AD. The Book of Baglan (1600–1607) calls him Gurleis, Goulisor, or Gwrleis, duke or prince of Cornwall, and husband of Eigyr; he is the father of Cador, and son of Sortogus, a direct male-line descendant of Maxentius, Dyfnwal Moelmud, Camber and Brutus of Troy.

William Worcester travelled to Cornwall in 1478, and recorded in his Itineraries that "Tador Duke of Cornwall, husband of the mother of Arthur was slain" at Castle an Dinas. This is generally interpreted as a conflation of Gorlois with Cador, and as an alternative place of Gorlois' death, differing from the Historia Regum Britanniaes account that he died at Dimilioc.

Henry Jenner considered Gorlois to be a real fifth or sixth century figure, either a petty chief and vassal of the Royal House of Dumnonia, or of the line of the original chiefs of the Dumnonii if the kings of Dumnonia were the leaders of the Britons displaced by the Saxons. He suggested that Bosworlas (in St Just) and Treworlas were place names taken from Gorlois, and notes that Bosworlas is very close to Bosigran.

References

Arthurian characters
Monarchs of Cornwall